Diagnostically acceptable irreversible compression (DAIC) is the amount of lossy compression which can be used on a medical image to produce a result that does not prevent the reader from using the image to make a medical diagnosis.

The term was first introduced at a workshop on irreversible compression convened by the European Society of Radiology (ESR) in Palma de Mallorca October 13, 2010, the results of which were reported in a subsequent position paper.

Determination 
The "amount of compression" in irreversible compression used to be determined by the compression ratio, where the acceptable minimum is determined by the algorithm (typically JPEG or J2K) and the data type (body part and imaging method). Such a definition is easy to follow, and has been used by medical bodies in 2010 around the world.

However, its downside is obvious: the compression ratio tells nothing about the real quality of the image, as different compressors can produce vastly different qualities under the same file size. For example, the JPEG format of 1992 can perform as well as many modern formats given newer techniques exploited in mozjpeg and ISO libjpeg, yet they would be lumped together with the legacy encoders in such a scheme.

The image compression community has long used objective quality metrics like SSIM to measure the effects of compression. In the absence of good data regarding SSIM, the ESR review of 2010 concluded that it is still difficult to establish a criterion for whether a particular irreversible compression scheme applied with particular parameters to a particular individual image, or category of images, avoids the introduction of some quantifiable risk of a diagnostic error for any particular diagnostic task.

An 2017 study showed that a SSIM variant called 4-G-r* (4-component, gradient, structural component of SSIM) best reflects changes in images that affect the decision of radiologists out of 16 SSIM variants. An 2020 study shows that visual information fidelity (VIF), feature similarity index (FSIM), and noise quality metric (NQM) best reflect radiologist preferences out of ten metrics. It also mentions that the original version of SSIM works as poorly as a basic root-mean-square distance (RMSD) for this purpose, a result echoed by the 2017 study. The 4-G-r* modification is not tested in the study.

References

Medical imaging
Image processing
Nuclear medicine